Roxane Desjardins (born 1991) is a Canadian writer from Quebec. She is the editor and general manager of the publishing house, Les Herbes rouges.

Biography
Roxane Desjardins was born in Montreal, 1991.

She began her literary practice with the artist's book and the fanzine. Her first collection of poetry, Ciseaux, was published in 2014 by Les Herbes rouges. In 2016, her story, Moi qui marche à tâtons dans ma jeunesse noire, was published by Les Herbes Rouges, for which she was a finalist for the 2017 Governor General's Awards for Literary Merit.

Desjardins served on the editorial board of the magazine Moebius between 2016 and 2018. Le Revers, her second collection of poetry, was published by Herbes Rouges in 2018, and was a finalist for the 2018 Governor General's Awards for Literary Merit. These three works received critical acclaim. Desjardins became publisher and general manager of Les Herbes rouges in 2021.

Prix et honneurs
 2013, Prix Expozine for the best French-language book for Cannibale maison
 2014, Prix Émile-Nelligan for Ciseaux
 2015, Prix Félix-Leclerc for Ciseaux
 2015, Longlisted for Prix des libraires du Québec pour Ciseaux
 2015, Prix Expozine for the best French-language book for  Avant le geste
 2017, Finalist, Governor General's Award of Canada, Children's Literature - Text category, for Moi qui marche à tâtons dans ma jeunesse noire
 2018, Finalist,  (SODEP) Excellence Award
 2018, Finalist, Governor General's Award, Poetry category, for  Le revers

Selected works

Poetry collections 
 Ciseaux, Montréal, Éditions Les Herbes rouges, 2014, .
 Le Revers, Montréal, Éditions Les Herbes rouges, 2018, .

Narrative 
 Moi qui marche à tâtons dans ma jeunesse noire, Montréal, Éditions Les Herbes rouges, 2016, .

Anthologies 
 La Poésie des Herbes rouges, co-edited with Jean-Simon DesRochers, Montréal, Éditions Les Herbes rouges, 2018, .

Zines 
 Constance succombe, illustrated by Coco-Simone Finken, 2013.
 Cannibale maison, illustrated by Coco-Simone Finken, 2013.
 Avant le geste, in collaboration with Félix Durand, livre d’artiste, 2015.

References

1991 births
Living people
Writers from Montreal
21st-century Canadian poets
Canadian editors
21st-century Canadian women writers
Canadian women poets
Canadian women editors
21st-century Canadian businesswomen
Canadian publishers (people)